The 3rd European Cross Country Championships were held at Charleroi in Belgium on 15 December 1996. Jon Brown took the title in the men's competition and Sara Wedlund won the women's race.

Results

Men individual 9.65 km

100 runners finished.

Men teams

Total 24 teams

Women individual 4.55 km

Iulia Negura from Romania finished first (16:58), but was disqualified because of doping violation.
73 runners finished.

Women teams

Total 19 teams

References

External links 
 Database containing all results between 1994–2007

European Cross Country Championships
European Cross Country Championships
1995 in Belgian sport
International athletics competitions hosted by Belgium
Cross country running in Belgium
December 1996 sports events in Europe
Sport in Charleroi